Melonie Dodaro is a Canadian social media expert, author and entrepreneur. She gained media attention when she used social media websites Facebook and Twitter to find her biological father whom she had never met. She is the founder and CEO of Top Dog Social Media.

Biography
Originally from Canada, Dodaro now lives in Amsterdam. In 2017, she became a dual citizen of the United Kingdom.

Dodaro began her entrepreneurial career as a franchisee with Herbal Magic in 1999 with two stores in Ontario, Canada. In 2004, she opened an LA Weight Loss franchise which she grew to three locations in British Columbia, Canada.  
She partnered with Bob Proctor from "The Secret" in 2007 to co-found Life Success Perfect Weight. She started her current company, Top Dog Social Media, in 2010.
As one of the top digital marketing experts and speakers, she has been featured on many "top marketers" lists and is a regular columnist for many industry publications including Social Media Today, Canadian Business Journal, and Social Media Examiner.

Dodaro had never met her biological father until she launched a social media campaign that went viral in 2015. After numerous fruitless attempts to find him, she started a hashtag campaign on Twitter using #FindCeesDeJong along with her story posted as a Facebook video. She had very limited information about him, only his name, age and place of birth. The task of finding him was quite difficult given that her father had a common name. Two Netherlands-based newspaper journalists working for de Stentor were able to help find her father after her video received over 30,000 views.

Books

Linkedin Unlocked, Top Dog Social Media, 2018

References

External links
 TopDogSocialMedia.com
 LinkedinUnlockedBook.com

1969 births
Living people
Canadian women non-fiction writers
Writers from Toronto